Khvolson is a crater on the far side of the Moon. It lies just to the east-southeast of the large walled plain Pasteur. Less than a crater diameter to the north-northeast of Khvolson is the crater Meitner, and just to the east-southeast lies Kondratyuk.

This crater has a roughly circular outer rim that is not overlaid by any impacts of significance. The inner walls appear as simple slopes down to the interior floor. Within the crater is a small crater in the northeastern quadrant of the floor. The interior is otherwise marked only by a few tiny craterlets and some irregularities.

Satellite craters
By convention these features are identified on lunar maps by placing the letter on the side of the crater midpoint that is closest to Khvolson.

References

 
 
 
 
 
 
 
 
 
 
 
 

Impact craters on the Moon